Robert Roth (5 July 1898 – 17 November 1959) was a Swiss wrestler who won a gold medal in the freestyle heavyweight class  at the 1920 Summer Olympics. Roth was a national champion in schwingen, Swiss national wrestling, in 1919 and 1921. Between 1922 and 1927 he competed as professional, but than returned to amateurs and won the national title in 1928 and 1931. His younger brothers Hans and Fritz were also Olympic wrestlers.

References

1898 births
1959 deaths
Olympic wrestlers of Switzerland
Wrestlers at the 1920 Summer Olympics
Swiss male sport wrestlers
Olympic gold medalists for Switzerland
Olympic medalists in wrestling
Medalists at the 1920 Summer Olympics
20th-century Swiss people